Mount Narodnaya (also known as Naroda and Poenurr; ,  ("People's Mountain"), Mansi: Поэӈ-ур, Поэн-урр) is the highest peak of the Urals in Russia. It is located on the border between Khanty–Mansi Autonomous Okrug in Tyumen Oblast and Komi Republic, the highest point being 0.5 km to the east from the border. The name may refer to Naroda River, which originates from the mount, located in the Research Range.

It is the highest point in European Russia outside the Caucasus.
Narodnaya is located in the Ural mountains water divide, and therefore on the border between Europe and Asia: the Naroda river flows south-east from the summit into the Ob river in Siberia, and the Kos'yu river flows north-west from the summit into the Pechora river in Europe.

The mountain is formed with quartzites and metamorphosed slates of the Proterozoic Eon and Cambrian Period. There are some glaciers on the mountain. Also, there are sparse forests of larch and birch in the deep valleys at the foot of the mountain. The slopes of the mountain are covered with highland tundra.

The easiest route to the summit is a technically easy hike on the moderate north-west slope. Depending on snow and ice conditions, crampons may be required. The south wall of Narodnaya is steeper and less commonly used to reach the summit.

See also
 List of highest points of Russian federal subjects
 List of European ultra prominent peaks

References

External links
 "Gora Narodnaya, Russia" on Peakbagger
 Mountain Narodnaya (People’s)

Ural Mountains
Landforms of Khanty-Mansi Autonomous Okrug
Mountains of the Komi Republic
Highest points of Russian federal subjects